The 1988–89 Quebec Nordiques season saw the team finish in fifth place in the Adams Division with a record of 27 wins, 46 losses, and 7 ties for 61 points.

Off-season
Quebec announced that interim head coach Ron Lapointe would come back on a permanent basis as head coach of the team. Lapointe had a 22-30-4 record with the Nordiques in 1987–88.

At the 1988 NHL Entry Draft, Quebec had two picks in the first round, the third overall pick, and the fifth overall pick. The Nordiques selected Curtis Leschyshyn of the Saskatoon Blades with the third pick. He had 14 goals and 55 points, and would see regular playing time with Quebec in the upcoming season. With the fifth pick, the Nordiques selected Daniel Dore. Dore had 24 goals, 63 points and 223 penalty minutes with the Drummondville Voltigeurs in 1987–88. In the later rounds of the draft, Quebec selected Valeri Kamensky and Alexei Gusarov of CSKA Moscow.

The Nordiques made some trades during the summer months, as they dealt away Mike Eagles to the Chicago Blackhawks for Bob Mason. Mason appeared in 41 games with Chicago, going 13-18-8 with a 4.15 GAA in 1987–88. Quebec then traded away Terry Carkner to the Philadelphia Flyers for Greg Smyth and the Flyers third round draft pick in the 1989 NHL Entry Draft. Smyth had a goal and seven points in 48 games with Philadelphia, as well as 192 penalty minutes.

Quebec's biggest trade of the summer was trading away Normand Rochefort and Jason Lafreniere to the New York Rangers for Bruce Bell, Jari Gronstrand, Walt Poddubny, and the Rangers fourth round draft pick in the 1989 NHL Entry Draft. Bell played his rookie season with the Nordiques in 1984–85, however, he spent most of the 1987–88 season with the Colorado Rangers of the IHL, where he had 11 goals and 45 points in 65 games. In 13 games with New York, Bell had a goal and two assists. Poddubny was coming off of a 38 goal and 88 point season with the Rangers in 1987–88. Poddubny scored 40 goals and 87 points with New York in 1986–87. Gronstrand had three goals and 14 points on the Rangers blueline in 1987–88.

Regular season
The Nordiques began the season with three wins in their first four games, however, Quebec would slump, and fall to 6-12-2 after twenty games. The team made some trades in December, acquiring former team captain Mario Marois from the Winnipeg Jets, however, the club continued to lose, and had an 11-20-2 record after 33 games. The Nordiques then fired Lapointe as head coach, and replaced him with Jean Perron on an interim basis. Perron had coached the Montreal Canadiens to the 1986 Stanley Cup. Under Perron, the club continued to lose, as Quebec quickly fell out of the playoff race. The team finished the season with a 27-46-7 record, earning 61 points, which was 18 points behind the Hartford Whalers for the final playoff spot in the Adams Division, and tied with the New York Islanders with the lowest point total in the league, On the basis of the Islanders winning more games (28-27), the Nords claimed last place in the overall standings.

Captain Peter Stastny led the club with 85 points, as he scored 35 goals and 50 assists in 72 games. Walt Poddubny scored a team high 38 goals in his first season with the Nordiques, as he also had 37 assists for 75 points. Michel Goulet saw his numbers drop to 26 goals and 64 points, his lowest totals since his rookie season in 1979–80. Rookie Joe Sakic had 23 goals and 62 points.

Jeff Brown had another solid season on the Nordiques blueline, scoring 21 goals and 68 points, good for third on team scoring. Brown had 13 powerplay goals, tied with Peter Stastny for second on the team, one behind team leader Walt Poddubny.

In goal, Mario Gosselin saw the majority of action, appearing in 39 games, earning 11 wins and a 4.24 GAA. Bob Mason had a tough season, earning only five wins in 22 games with a 4.73 GAA, while Ron Tugnutt had a 10-10-3 record in 26 games, with a team best 3.60 GAA and a.893 save percentage.

Final standings

Schedule and results

Player statistics

Forwards

Defencemen

Goaltending

Transactions
The Nordiques were involved in the following transactions during the 1988–89 season.

Trades

Waivers

Free agents

Draft picks
Quebec's draft picks from the 1988 NHL Entry Draft, which was held at the Montreal Forum in Montreal, Quebec.

Farm teams
 Fredericton Express—AHL

References

Quebec Nordiques season, 1988-89
Quebec Nordiques seasons
Que